Henry Loste (May 27, 1899 in Bordeaux - June 16, 1978 in Mérignac) is a former senator of Wallis and Futuna. He was elected on September 23, 1962, and his term ended October 1, 1971.

See also 

 List of senators of Wallis and Futuna

References 

Senators of Wallis and Futuna
Wallis and Futuna politicians
1899 births
1978 deaths